Gorodishche is a rural locality (a khutor) in Alexeyevsky District, Belgorod Oblast, Russia. The population was 56 as of 2010. There are 3 streets.

Geography 
Gorodishche is located 17 km southeast of Alexeyevka (the district's administrative centre) by road.

References 

Rural localities in Alexeyevsky District, Belgorod Oblast